Elham Hashemi Masoumi (born 19 September 1971 in Shiraz) is an Iranian shooting coach and former sport shooter. She coached the Iranian rifle team at the 2020 Summer Olympics and is currently working on the same position in Denmark. Hashemi also has an A ISSF coaching degree. She also won a bronze medal at the 2002 Asian Games.

References 

1971 births
Living people
Iranian female sport shooters
People from Shiraz
Asian Games bronze medalists for Iran
Asian Games medalists in shooting
Shooters at the 1994 Asian Games
Shooters at the 1998 Asian Games
Shooters at the 2002 Asian Games
Medalists at the 2002 Asian Games
21st-century Iranian women